Type 92 may refer to:

Weapons 
 Type 92 machine gun
 Type 92 Heavy Machine Gun
 7.7mm Type 92 machine-gun cartridge
 Type 92 Battalion Gun
 Type 92 10 cm Cannon
 Type 92 torpedo
 Type 92 Handgun

Armored cars 
 Type 92 variant of the WZ551 armored personnel carrier
 Type 92 Jyu-Sokosha armored car

Airplanes 
 Kawasaki Type 92 biplane
 Bristol Type 92 biplane
 Mitsubishi 2MR8 reconnaissance aircraft
 Mitsubishi Ki-20 heavy bomber

Other 
 The NSB Class 92 diesel railway multiple unit